The following is a list of Major League Baseball players, retired or active. As of the end of the 2011 season, there have been 1,702 players with a last name that begins with B who have been on a major league roster at some point.

B

Charlie Babb
Bob Babcock
Loren Babe
Johnny Babich
Charlie Babington
Shooty Babitt
Brandon Backe
Les Backman
Wally Backman
Eddie Bacon
Mike Bacsik (RHP)
Mike Bacsik (LHP)
Dakota Bacus
Fred Baczewski
Akil Baddoo
Burke Badenhop
Art Bader
Harrison Bader
Lore Bader
Red Badgro
Ed Baecht
Cha Seung Baek
Carlos Baerga
Benito Báez
Danys Báez
Javier Báez
José Báez
Kevin Baez
Michel Báez
Pedro Báez
Sandy Báez
Jim Bagby
Jim Bagby Jr.
Ed Bagley
Gene Bagley
Bill Bagwell
Jeff Bagwell
Stan Bahnsen
Ed Bahr
Frank Bahret
Grover Baichley
Scott Bailes
Andrew Bailey
Bill Bailey
Bill Bailey
Bob Bailey
Brandon Bailey
Cory Bailey
Ed Bailey
Fred Bailey
Gene Bailey
Harvey Bailey
Homer Bailey
Howard Bailey
Jeff Bailey
Jim Bailey
King Bailey
Mark Bailey
Roger Bailey
Steve Bailey
Sweetbreads Bailey
Bob Bailor
Harold Baines
Doug Bair
Al Baird
Bob Baird
Doug Baird
Jeff Baisley
Jeff Bajenaru
Dave Bakenhaster
Al Baker
Bill Baker
Bock Baker
Charlie Baker
Chuck Baker
Dave Baker
Del Baker
Doug Baker
Dusty Baker
Ernie Baker
Floyd Baker
Frank Baker (OF)
Frank "Home Run" Baker β
Gene Baker
George Baker
Howard Baker
Jack Baker
Jeff Baker
Jesse Baker (pitcher)
Jesse Baker (shortstop)
John Baker
Norm Baker
Scott Baker (LHP)
Scott Baker (RHP)
Tom Baker (1930s P)
Tom Baker (1960s P)
Tracy Baker
Paul Bako
John Balaz
Steve Balboni
Bobby Balcena
Rocco Baldelli
Jack Baldschun
Billy Baldwin
Dave Baldwin
Henry Baldwin
James Baldwin
Jeff Baldwin
Lady Baldwin
Mark Baldwin
Reggie Baldwin
John Bale
Wladimir Balentien
Lee Bales
Collin Balester
Grant Balfour
Art Ball
Jeff Ball
Neal Ball
Jeff Ballard
Pelham Ballenger
Jay Baller
Mark Ballinger
Win Ballou
Tony Balsamo
George Bamberger
Dave Bancroft β
Chris Bando
Sal Bando
Eddie Bane
Dick Baney
Jeff Banister
Dan Bankhead
Scott Bankhead
Brian Banks
Ernie Banks β
George Banks
Josh Banks
Willie Banks
Alan Bannister
Brian Bannister
Floyd Bannister
Jack Banta
Travis Baptist
Rod Barajas
Walter Barbare
Johnny Barbato
Jap Barbeau
Steve Barber
Turner Barber
Frank Barberich
Bret Barberie
Jim Barbieri
George Barclay
Daniel Bard
Josh Bard
Brian Barden
Ray Bare
Jesse Barfield
John Barfield
Josh Barfield
Clyde Barfoot
Cy Barger
Brian Bark
Al Barker
Glen Barker
Kevin Barker
Len Barker
Ray Barker
Richie Barker
Sean Barker
Andy Barkett
Brian Barkley
Jeff Barkley
Red Barkley
Sam Barkley
Mike Barlow
Tom Barlow
Clint Barmes
Babe Barna
Bill Barnes
Brian Barnes
Frank Barnes (LHP)
Honey Barnes
Jesse Barnes
John Barnes
Larry Barnes
Lute Barnes
Red Barnes
Rich Barnes
Ross Barnes
Sam Barnes
Skeeter Barnes
Virgil Barnes
Darwin Barney
Ed Barney
Rex Barney
Les Barnhart
Chris Barnwell
Salomé Barojas
Daniel Barone
Bob Barr (1880s P)
Bob Barr (1930s P)
Jim Barr
Scotty Barr
Steve Barr
Cuno Barragan
Bill Barrett (OF)
Bill Barrett (UT)
Bob Barrett
Dick Barrett
Frank Barrett
Jimmy Barrett
John Barrett
Johnny Barrett
Marty Barrett
Michael Barrett
Red Barrett
Tim Barrett
Tom Barrett
Francisco Barrios
Manuel Barrios
Red Barron
Tony Barron
Ed Barry
Jack Barry
Jeff Barry
Kevin Barry
Rich Barry
Shad Barry
Kimera Bartee
Dick Bartell
Bob Barthelson
Les Bartholomew
Jason Bartlett
Boyd Bartley
Bob Barton
Brian Barton
Daric Barton
Shawn Barton
Vince Barton
Cliff Bartosh
Chris Başak
Al Baschang
Monty Basgall
Walt Bashore
Eddie Basinski
Jim Baskette
Brian Bass
Dick Bass
Doc Bass
John Bass
Kevin Bass
Norm Bass
Randy Bass
Charley Bassett
Johnny Bassler
Charlie Bastian
Emil Batch
Joe Batchelder
Rich Batchelor
John Bateman
Billy Bates
Bud Bates
Del Bates
Dick Bates
Jason Bates
Johnny Bates
Ray Bates
Bill Bathe
Miguel Batista
Rafael Batista
Tony Batista
Kevin Batiste
Kim Batiste
George Batten
Earl Battey
Joe Battin
Allen Battle
Howard Battle
Jim Battle
Chris Batton
Matt Batts
Hank Bauer
Lou Bauer
Rick Bauer
Russ Bauers
Justin Baughman
Frank Baumann
Paddy Baumann
Jim Baumer
Ross Baumgarten
Stan Baumgartner
Frank Baumholtz
George Bausewine
Danny Bautista
Denny Bautista
José Bautista (IF/OF)
José Bautista (P)
Jim Baxes
Mike Baxes
Moose Baxter
Harry Bay
Jason Bay
Jonah Bayliss
Don Baylor
Bill Bayne
Yorman Bazardo
Brandon Beachy
Bob Beall
Johnny Beall
Walter Beall
Tommy Beals
Ernie Beam
T. J. Beam
Charlie Beamon
Charlie Beamon Jr.
Trey Beamon
Belve Bean
Billy Bean
Colter Bean
Billy Beane
Dave Beard
Ollie Beard
Ralph Beard
Gene Bearden
Gary Beare
Larry Bearnarth
Kevin Bearse
Chris Beasley
Lew Beasley
Ed Beatin
Jim Beattie
Blaine Beatty
Jim Beauchamp
Ginger Beaumont
Ed Beavens
Johnny Beazley
Steve Bechler
George Bechtel
Boom-Boom Beck
Erve Beck
Frank Beck
Fred Beck
George Beck
Rich Beck
Rod Beck
Zinn Beck
Beals Becker
Heinie Beckendorf
Heinz Becker
Joe Becker
Rich Becker
Glenn Beckert
Josh Beckett
Robbie Beckett
Gordon Beckham
Jake Beckley β
Bill Beckmann
Joe Beckwith
Julio Bécquer
Érik Bédard
Gene Bedford
Phil Bedgood
Hugh Bedient
Steve Bedrosian
Fred Beebe
Matt Beech
Ed Beecher
Jodie Beeler
Fred Beene
Clarence Beers
Jim Begley
Joe Beggs
Petie Behan
Rick Behenna
Hank Behrman
Joe Beimel
Kevin Beirne
Ollie Bejma
Mark Belanger
Wayne Belardi
Kevin Belcher
Tim Belcher
Stan Belinda
Bo Belinsky
Matt Belisle
Todd Belitz
Tim Belk
Beau Bell
Bill Bell
Buddy Bell
Charlie Bell
David Bell
Derek Bell
Eric Bell
Frank Bell
Gary Bell
George Bell (OF)
George Bell (P)
Gus Bell
Heath Bell
Hi Bell
Jay Bell
Jerry Bell
Juan Bell
Kevin Bell
Les Bell
Mike Bell (1B)
Mike Bell (3B)
Rob Bell
Rudy Bell
Zeke Bella
Steve Bellán
Albert Belle
Mark Bellhorn
Rafael Belliard
Ronnie Belliard
Clay Bellinger
Cody Bellinger
Carlos Beltrán
Francis Beltrán
Rigo Beltrán
Adrián Beltré
Esteban Beltré
Harry Bemis
Marvin Benard
Freddie Benavides
Johnny Bench β
Chief Bender β
Art Benedict
Bruce Benedict
Alan Benes
Andy Benes
Ray Benge
Benny Bengough
Juan Beníquez
Armando Benítez
Yamil Benítez
Mike Benjamin
Stan Benjamin
Henry Benn
Ike Benners
Charlie Bennett
Dave Bennett
Dennis Bennett
Erik Bennett
Frank Bennett
Gary Bennett
Herschel Bennett
Jeff Bennett
Joe Bennett
Joel Bennett
Shayne Bennett
Joaquín Benoit
Kris Benson
Vern Benson
Cy Bentley
Jack Bentley
Al Benton
Butch Benton
Larry Benton
Rabbit Benton
Rube Benton
Sid Benton
Chad Bentz
Joe Benz
Todd Benzinger
Johnny Berardino
Lou Berberet
Jeff Berblinger
Jason Bere
Juan Berenguer
Bruce Berenyi
Dave Berg
Moe Berg
Augie Bergamo
Bill Bergen
Marty Bergen
Boze Berger
Brandon Berger
Heinie Berger
Johnny Berger
Tun Berger
Wally Berger
Peter Bergeron
John Bergh
Al Bergman
Dave Bergman
Dusty Bergman
Sean Bergman
Jason Bergmann
William Bergolla
Nate Berkenstock
Lance Berkman
Jack Berly
Roger Bernadina
Dwight Bernard
Joe Bernard
Tony Bernazard
Adam Bernero
Bill Bernhard
Juan Bernhardt
Walter Bernhardt
Dale Berra
Yogi Berra β
Ray Berres
Ángel Berroa
Gerónimo Berroa
Charlie Berry (2B)
Charlie Berry (C)
Claude Berry
Joe Berry (2B)
Joe Berry (P)
Ken Berry
Neil Berry
Sean Berry
Tom Berry
Damon Berryhill
Frank Bertaina
Harry Berte
Dick Bertell
Reno Bertoia
Mike Bertotti
Lefty Bertrand
Andrés Berumen
Fred Besana
Bob Bescher
Don Bessent
Karl Best
William Bestick
Rafael Betancourt
Yuniesky Betancourt
Frank Betcher
Wilson Betemit
Larry Bettencourt
Huck Betts
Bruno Betzel
Kurt Bevacqua
Hal Bevan
Bill Bevens
Jason Beverlin
Ben Beville
Monte Beville
Buddy Biancalana
Hank Biasatti
Jim Bibby
Dante Bichette
Vern Bickford
Charlie Bicknell
Rocky Biddle
Oscar Bielaski
Mike Bielecki
Nick Bierbrodt
Randor Bierd
Charlie Bierman
Steve Bieser
Carson Bigbee
Lyle Bigbee
Larry Bigbie
Elliot Bigelow
Craig Biggio
Larry Biittner
Dann Bilardello
Emil Bildilli
Steve Bilko
Harry Billiard
Jack Billingham
Dick Billings
Josh Billings
Brent Billingsley
Chad Billingsley
George Binks
Steve Biras
Jud Birchall
Doug Bird
George Bird
Mike Birkbeck
Kurt Birkins
Ralph Birkofer
Joe Birmingham
Babe Birrer
Tim Birtsas
John Bischoff
Joseph Bisenius
Bill Bishop (1880s P)
Bill Bishop (1920s P)
Charlie Bishop
Jim Bishop
Lloyd Bishop
Max Bishop
Mike Bishop
Rivington Bisland
Del Bissonette
Hiram Bithorn
Joe Bitker
Jeff Bittiger
Red Bittmann
Brian Bixler
George Bjorkman
Bud Black (LHP)
Bud Black (RHP)
Dave Black
Don Black
Joe Black
Earl Blackburn
George Blackburn
Nick Blackburn
Lena Blackburne
Travis Blackley
Ewell Blackwell
Tim Blackwell
Ray Blades
Rick Bladt
George Blaeholder
Bill Blair
Dennis Blair
Footsie Blair
Paul Blair
Walter Blair
Willie Blair
Dick Blaisdell
Casey Blake
Ed Blake
Harry Blake
Sheriff Blake
Hank Blalock
Johnny Blanchard
Andrés Blanco
Dámaso Blanco
Gregor Blanco
Henry Blanco
Ossie Blanco
Tony Blanco
Fred Blanding
Cliff Blankenship
Kevin Blankenship
Lance Blankenship
Ted Blankenship
Larvell Blanks
Cy Blanton
Joe Blanton
Don Blasingame
Wade Blasingame
Steve Blateric
Johnny Blatnik
Buddy Blattner
Jeff Blauser
Henry Blauvelt
Gary Blaylock
Ron Blazier
Curt Blefary
Ike Blessitt
Clarence Blethen
Jerry Blevins
Ned Bligh
Elmer Bliss
Jack Bliss
Bruno Block
Cy Block
Terry Blocker
Ron Blomberg
Jimmy Bloodworth
Willie Bloomquist
Greg Blosser
Jack Blott
Mike Blowers
Lu Blue
Vida Blue
Ossie Bluege
Jim Bluejacket
Red Bluhm
Geoff Blum
Bert Blyleven
Mike Blyzka
Chet Boak
Frederick Boardman
Randy Bobb
Hiram Bocachica
John Boccabella
Milt Bocek
Bruce Bochte
Doug Bochtler
Bruce Bochy
Eddie Bockman
Randy Bockus
Brian Bocock
Mike Boddicker
Ping Bodie
Tony Boeckel
George Boehler
Len Boehmer
Brian Boehringer
Larry Boerner
Brennan Boesch
Joe Boever
Tim Bogar
Terry Bogener
Brandon Boggs
Mitchell Boggs
Tommy Boggs
Wade Boggs β
Brian Bogusevic
Brian Bohanon
T. J. Bohn
Sam Bohne
John Bohnet
Bruce Boisclair
Dan Boitano
Dick Bokelmann
Bob Boken
Joe Bokina
Boland
Bernie Boland
Charlie Bold
Stew Bolen
Joe Boley
Jim Bolger
Frank Bolick
Bobby Bolin
Frank Bolling
Jack Bolling
Milt Bolling
Don Bollweg
Mike Bolsinger
Cecil Bolton
Cliff Bolton
Tom Bolton
Rodney Bolton
Mark Bomback
Tommy Bond
Walt Bond
Jeremy Bonderman
Barry Bonds
Bobby Bonds
George Bone
Ricky Bones
Julio Bonetti
Hank Boney
Jung Bong
Nino Bongiovanni
Bill Bonham
Tiny Bonham
Emilio Bonifacio
Joe Bonikowski
Eddie Bonine
Bobby Bonilla
Juan Bonilla
Barry Bonnell
Bobby Bonner
Frank Bonner
Bill Bonness
Boof Bonser
Zeke Bonura
Everitt Booe
Buddy Booker
Chris Booker
Greg Booker
Rod Booker
Red Booles
Aaron Boone
Bob Boone
Bret Boone
Dan Boone
Danny Boone
Ike Boone
Lute Boone
Ray Boone
Chris Bootcheck
Booth
Eddie Booth
Josh Booty
John Boozer
Pedro Borbón
Pedro Borbón Jr.
Joe Borchard
George Borchers
Frenchy Bordagaray
Joe Borden
Pat Borders
Rich Bordi
Mike Bordick
Glenn Borgmann
Paul Boris
Frank Bork
Bob Borkowski
Dave Borkowski
Toby Borland
Tom Borland
Red Borom
Steve Boros
Joe Borowski
Hank Borowy
Babe Borton
Don Bosch
Rick Bosetti
Chris Bosio
Shawn Boskie
Thad Bosley
Dick Bosman
Harley Boss
Mel Bosser
Lyman Bostock
Daryl Boston
Dave Boswell
Ken Boswell
Derek Botelho
Ricky Bottalico
John Bottarini
Kent Bottenfield
Ralph Botting
Jim Bottomley β
Jason Botts
Bob Botz
Ed Bouchee
Denis Boucher
Lou Boudreau β
Carl Bouldin
Steve Bourgeois
Peter Bourjos
Michael Bourn
Rafael Bournigal
Pat Bourque
Jim Bouton
Mike Bovee
Larry Bowa
Benny Bowcock
Michael Bowden
Rob Bowen
Ryan Bowen
Sam Bowen
Sam Bowens
Frank Bowerman
Brent Bowers
Cedrick Bowers
Shane Bowers
Stew Bowers
Jim Bowie
Micah Bowie
John Bowker
Charlie Bowles
Weldon Bowlin
Steve Bowling
Abe Bowman
Bill Bowman
Bob Bowman
Elmer Bowman
Ernie Bowman
Joe Bowman
Sumner Bowman
Ted Bowsfield
Travis Bowyer
Bill Boyd
Bob Boyd
Gary Boyd
Jason Boyd
Oil Can Boyd
Blaine Boyer
Clete Boyer
Cloyd Boyer
Ken Boyer
Doe Boyland
Buzz Boyle
Eddie Boyle
Jack Boyle (C / 1B)
Jack Boyle (3B)
Gene Brabender
Gibby Brack
Jack Bracken
Dallas Braden
John Brackenridge
Bill Bradford
Buddy Bradford
Chad Bradford
Bill Bradley
Foghorn Bradley
George Bradley
Herb Bradley
Hugh Bradley
Jack Bradley
Mark Bradley
Milton Bradley
Phil Bradley
Ryan Bradley
Scott Bradley
Tom Bradley
Dallas Bradshaw
Joe Bradshaw
Terry Bradshaw
Brian Brady
Cliff Brady
Doug Brady
King Brady
Neal Brady
Spike Brady
Bobby Bragan
Darren Bragg
Dick Braggins
Glenn Braggs
Dave Brain
Asa Brainard
Erv Brame
Art Bramhall
Ralph Branca
Al Brancato
Norm Branch
Roy Branch
Ron Brand
Mark Brandenburg
Bucky Brandon
Ed Brandt
Jackie Brandt
Mike Brannock
Kitty Bransfield
Jeff Branson
Marshall Brant
Cliff Brantley
Jeff Brantley
Mickey Brantley
Russell Branyan
Fred Bratschi
Ryan Braun (3B)
Ryan Braun (pitcher)
Steve Braun
Ángel Bravo
Garland Braxton
Bill Bray
Buster Bray
Craig Brazell
Dewon Brazelton
Frank Brazill
Al Brazle
Yhency Brazobán
Lesli Brea
Sid Bream
Jim Breazeale
Harry Brecheen
Brent Brede
Danny Breeden
Hal Breeden
Marv Breeding
Fred Breining
Alonzo Breitenstein
Ted Breitenstein
Bob Brenly
Ad Brennan
Don Brennan
Jack Brennan
Tom Brennan
William Brennan
Jim Brenneman
Bert Brenner
Lynn Brenton
Bill Brenzel
Craig Breslow
Roger Bresnahan β
Rube Bressler
Eddie Bressoud
George Brett β
Herb Brett
Ken Brett
Billy Brewer
Chet Brewer
Jack Brewer
Jim Brewer
Rod Brewer
Tom Brewer
Tony Brewer
Jamie Brewington
Charlie Brewster
Fred Brickell
Fritz Brickell
Ralph Brickner
Jim Brideweser
Marshall Bridges
Rocky Bridges
Tommy Bridges
Al Bridwell
Bunny Brief
Buttons Briggs
Dan Briggs
John Briggs
Johnny Briggs
Harry Bright
Nelson Briles
Greg Briley
Frank Brill
Jim Brillheart
Bill Brinker
Chuck Brinkman
Ed Brinkman
Leon Brinkopf
John Briscoe
Lou Brissie
George Bristow
Bernardo Brito
Eude Brito
Jorge Brito
Juan Brito
Tilson Brito
Jim Britt
Jack Brittin
Chris Britton
Jim Britton
Zach Britton
Tony Brizzolara
Johnny Broaca
Lance Broadway
Pete Broberg
Doug Brocail
Greg Brock
John Brock
Lou Brock β
Matt Broderick
King Brockett
Steve Brodie
Dick Brodowski
Ernie Broglio
Rico Brogna
Jack Brohamer
Troy Brohawn
Jeff Bronkey
Herman Bronkie
Jim Bronstad
Ike Brookens
Tom Brookens
Bobby Brooks
Frank Brooks
Hubie Brooks
Jerry Brooks
Scott Brosius
Jim Brosnan
Terry Bross
Mark Brouhard
Ben Broussard
Dan Brouthers β
Joe Brovia
Scott Brow
Bob Brower
Frank Brower
Jim Brower
Louis Brower
Adrian Brown
Alton Brown
Andrew Brown (OF)
Andrew Brown (P)
Bob Brown
Bobby Brown (3B)
Bobby Brown (OF)
Boardwalk Brown
Brant Brown
Buster Brown
Charlie Brown
Chris Brown
Clint Brown
Curt Brown
Curtis Brown
Darrell Brown
Dee Brown
Dick Brown
Ed Brown
Eddie Brown
Elmer Brown
Emil Brown
Fred Brown
Gates Brown
Hal Brown
Ike Brown
Jackie Brown
Jamie Brown
Jarvis Brown
Jeremy Brown
Jim Brown (P)
Jim Brown (OF)
Jimmy Brown
John Brown
Jumbo Brown
Keith Brown
Kevin Brown (C)
Kevin Brown (RHP)
Kevin Brown (LHP)
Larry Brown
Leon Brown
Lew Brown
Lindsay Brown
Lloyd Brown
Mace Brown
Mark Brown
Marty Brown
Mike Brown (P)
Mike Brown (OF)
Mordecai "Three Finger" Brown β
Ollie Brown
Paul Brown
Randy Brown
Robert Brown
Roosevelt Brown
Scott Brown
Steve Brown
Tom Brown (CF)
Tom Brown (OF/1B)
Tom Brown (P)
Tommy Brown
Walter Brown
Willard Brown β
Byron Browne
George Browne
Jerry Browne
Frank Browning
Pete Browning
Tom Browning
Mark Brownson
Jonathan Broxton
Bruce Brubaker
Bob Bruce
Jay Bruce
Fred Bruckbauer
Earle Brucker Sr.
Earle Brucker Jr.
Andy Bruckmiller
J. T. Bruett
Cliff Brumbaugh
Jacob Brumfield
Duff Brumley
Mike Brumley (C)
Mike Brumley (IF)
Glenn Brummer
Greg Brummett
Tom Brunansky
Jack Bruner
Roy Bruner
George Brunet
Justin Brunette
Brian Bruney
Tom Bruno
Arlo Brunsberg
Will Brunson
Eric Bruntlett
Jim Bruske
Warren Brusstar
Bill Bruton
Billy Bryan
Clay Bryant
Derek Bryant
Don Bryant
Ralph Bryant
Ron Bryant
T. R. Bryden
Steve Brye
Jaime Bubela
Johnny Bucha
Bob Buchanan
Brian Buchanan
Jim Buchanan
Jim Bucher
Jerry Buchek
Jim Bucher
Clay Buchholz
Taylor Buchholz
John Buck
Travis Buck
Garland Buckeye
Fred Buckingham
Jess Buckles
John Buckley
Kevin Buckley
Bill Buckner
Billy Buckner
Jay Budd
Mike Buddie
Don Buddin
Mark Budzinski
Steve Buechele
Mark Buehrle
Fritz Buelow
Francisley Bueno
Charlie Buffinton
Damon Buford
Don Buford
Bob Buhl
Jay Buhner
DeWayne Buice
Cy Buker
Ryan Bukvich
Jason Bulger
Scott Bullett
Jim Bullinger
Kirk Bullinger
Bryan Bullington
Eric Bullock
Red Bullock
William B Bullock
Al Bumbry
Madison Bumgarner
Nate Bump
Melvin Bunch
Wally Bunker
Jim Bunning β
Dave Burba
Bill Burbach
Nelson Burbrink
Al Burch
Ernie Burch
Larry Burchart
Fred Burchell
Bob Burda
Lew Burdette
Jack Burdock
Smoky Burgess
Tom Burgess
Tom Burgmeier
Bill Burgo
Ambiorix Burgos
Enrique Burgos
Bill Burich
Mack Burk
Sandy Burk
Elmer Burkart
Bill Burke
Bobby Burke
Chris Burke
Dan Burke
Eddie Burke
Frank Burke
Glenn Burke
Jamie Burke
Jimmy Burke
John Burke
Leo Burke
Les Burke
Mike Burke
Steve Burke
Tim Burke
Jesse Burkett β
John Burkett
Ken Burkhart
Morgan Burkhart
Ellis Burks
Rick Burleson
A. J. Burnett
Hercules Burnett
Johnny Burnett
Sean Burnett
Wally Burnette
Jeromy Burnitz
Bill Burns
Britt Burns
Dick Burns
Ed Burns
Farmer Burns
George Burns (1B)
George Burns (LF)
Jack Burns
Mike Burns
Oyster Burns
Todd Burns
Tom Burns
Pete Burnside
Sheldon Burnside
Alex Burr
Buster Burrell
Pat Burrell
Brian Burres
Larry Burright
Ray Burris
Emmanuel Burriss
Jeff Burroughs
Sean Burroughs
John Burrows
Terry Burrows
Dick Burrus
Ellis Burton
Jared Burton
Jim Burton
Moe Burtschy
Bill Burwell
Dick Burwell
Jim Busby
Paul Busby
Steve Busby
Mike Busch
Brian Buscher
Bullet Joe Bush
Dave Bush
Donie Bush
Guy Bush
Homer Bush
Randy Bush
Jack Bushelman
Frank Bushey
Chris Bushing
Doc Bushong
Mike Buskey
Tom Buskey
Hank Butcher
John Butcher
Max Butcher
Mike Butcher
Sal Butera
Bill Butland
Bill Butler
Billy Butler
Brent Butler
Brett Butler
Charlie Butler
Ike Butler
John Butler
Johnny Butler
Rich Butler
Rob Butler
Ralph Buxton
Joe Buzas
John Buzhardt
Bud Byerly
Freddie Bynum
Mike Bynum
Bill Byrd
Harry Byrd
Jeff Byrd
Jim Byrd
Marlon Byrd
Paul Byrd
Sammy Byrd
Tim Byrdak
Bobby Byrne
Tommy Byrne
Eric Byrnes
Marty Bystrom

References
Last Names starting with B - Baseball-Reference.com

 B